Mad Dog American is the debut album by American rap metal group SX-10. It was released on June 6, 2000. The twelve-track record featured guest appearances by the likes of Mellow Man Ace, Kottonmouth Kings, Everlast, Rey Oropeza, and DJ Muggs & Eric Bobo from Cypress Hill.

Allmusic reviewer John Young wrote that "The band sounds like a stripped-down, unambitious Rage Against the Machine—and though this couldn't have been the intention, for better or worse, SX-10 is more enjoyable than most of the Cypress Hill you're likely to hear".

The album was reissued in Europe with new artwork and re-titled as Rhymes in the Chamber in 2004, on the Music Avenue label.

Track listing

Personnel
Andy Zambrano – guitar
Brian McNelis – A&R
Brian Perera – A&R
Chuck Wright – bass
Fabrice Henssens – photography
Frank Mercurio – bass
Glen Sobel – drums
Greg Flynn – CD layout
Jeremy Fleener – guitar
Kevin Smith – engineering, mixing
Kevin Zinger – executive producer, management
Lanny Cordola – producer
Senen Reyes – vocals, executive producer, producer
Steven Marcussen – mastering

References

2000 debut albums
SX-10 albums
Cleopatra Records albums